The Whoniverse is the non-narrative name given to the fictional setting of the television series Doctor Who, Torchwood, The Sarah Jane Adventures and Class as well as other related media. The word, a portmanteau of the words Who and universe, was originally used to describe the show's production and fanbase.

The term is used to link characters, ideas or items which are seen across multiple productions, such as Sarah Jane Smith from Doctor Who, K-9 and Company (1981) and The Sarah Jane Adventures (2007–2011), Jack Harkness from Doctor Who and Torchwood as well as K-9 from Doctor Who, K-9 and Company, The Sarah Jane Adventures, and K-9.

Unlike the owners of other science fiction franchises, the BBC takes no position on canon, and recent producers of the show have expressed distaste for the idea. The term has recently begun to appear in mainstream press coverage following the popular success of the 2005 Doctor Who revival. At Bad Wolf Studios, the production company who have been making Doctor Who since 2023, they display that they are 'The Home of the Whoniverse'.

Some have also speculated that the Blake's 7 series is also part of the same universe, due to a character known as Carnell appearing in the Blake's 7 episode "Weapon", who would also later appear in the Doctor Who novel Corpse Marker and the Kaldor City spin-off audio series. Another issue sometimes puzzling fans are the canonicity and fictional existence levels of the 1960s Dr. Who film adaptations, which were sometimes hinted to or referenced in ambiguous manners in other media both as fictional works based on the Doctor's adventures and as actual events happening.

The Whoniverse is also referred to as Earth-5556 in the Marvel Multiverse.

Features
The Whoniverse has given rise to a wide variety of lifeforms, including the Time Lords, the Daleks, and the Cybermen, as well as the Sontarans, Silurians, Ice Warriors, and the Weeping Angels, who have appeared in several episodes.

Due to the time travelling nature of the show, the Whoniverse setting has been covered across points from its formation in a big bang event (in 1983's Terminus and the 1985 audio drama Slipback), to its heat death in the year "100 trillion" (in 2007's "Utopia"). Important events shown include the Time War, the formation of the Earth and its eventual destruction in the year "5 billion" (in 2005's "The End of the World"), and the destruction and recreation of the universe (in 2010's "The Pandorica Opens"/"The Big Bang").

Original usage

In his 1983 book Doctor Who: A Celebration; Two Decades Through Time and Space, Peter Haining called his final chapter "The Whoniverse". The section assembled factual information about all the episodes to date, but also gave information about fan clubs and ancillary entertainments related to the programme.  Thus, the term Whoniverse referred to everything connected with the programme behind-the-scenes.  In this meaning, standing exhibitions, discussions about the filming of episodes and even the fandom itself were considered part of the "Whoniverse".  The term Whoniverse is still used with this definition today,  including as the name of a Doctor Who convention in Australia.

See also
 "From The Doctor to my son Thomas"
 List of Doctor Who universe creatures and aliens
 List of science fiction universes

References
Citations

Bibliography

Further reading

External links

Doctor Who universe at Tardis Data Core

Doctor Who fandom
The Sarah Jane Adventures
Torchwood
Fictional universes
Doctor Who locations